The U.S. state of West Virginia has 55 counties. Fifty of them existed at the time of the Wheeling Convention in 1861, during the American Civil War, when those counties seceded from the Commonwealth of Virginia to form the new state of West Virginia. West Virginia was admitted as a separate state of the United States on June 20, 1863. Five additional counties (Grant, Mineral, Lincoln, Summers, and Mingo) were formed from the original counties in the decades following admission.

After the Civil War, Berkeley County and Jefferson County, the two easternmost counties of West Virginia, refused to recognize their inclusion in the state, and the Virginia General Assembly passed legislation attempting to reclaim them. In March 1866, the United States Congress passed a joint mandate assenting to their inclusion in the new state, and the Supreme Court of the United States confirmed this outcome in the case of Virginia v. West Virginia (1871).

The West Virginia Constitution was ratified in 1872, replacing the state constitution created in 1863 when West Virginia became a state. Creation of a new county is prohibited if it would bring another county below these thresholds. Three counties (Greenbrier, Kanawha, and Randolph) have sufficient population (based on the 2020 United States Census) and land area to allow a new county to be split off. The remaining counties cannot be split, as either their land area would decrease to under 400 square miles, or their population would decrease to below 6,000.

The role of counties in local government had been minimized under the 1863 constitution, which vested most local government authority in a system of townships based on the New England model. The authors of the 1872 constitution chose to return to the system used in Virginia, in which each county was governed by a county court with combined authority for executive, legislative, and judicial functions of the county government. In 1880, West Virginia amended its constitution and replaced the county court system with an arrangement that divides county government powers between seven county offices, each of which is independently elected: the county commission, county clerk, circuit clerk, county sheriff, county assessor, county prosecuting attorney, and county surveyor of lands. Counties have only those powers that are expressly granted to them by the state Constitution or by state statute. These powers include, but are not limited to, maintaining the infrastructure of the state, funding libraries, maintaining jails and hospitals, and waste disposal. Reforming public education became a county function in 1933. In May 1933, a county unit plan was adopted. Under this plan, the state's 398 school districts were consolidated into the current 55 county school systems. This enabled public schools to be funded more economically and saved West Virginia millions of dollars.

Kanawha County contributed land to the founding of 12 West Virginia counties and has the largest population (177,952 in 2021). Wirt County has the smallest population (5,063 in 2021). The oldest county is Hampshire, established in 1754, and the newest is Mingo, established in 1895. Federal Information Processing Standard (FIPS) codes, which are used by the United States government to identify counties uniquely, are five-digit numbers. For West Virginia, they start with 54 and end with the three-digit county code (for example, Barbour County has FIPS code 54001). Each county's code is provided in the table below, linked to census data for that county.

Counties

|}

See also
 List of governors of West Virginia
 List of National Historic Landmarks in West Virginia

References

 
Counties of Appalachia
West Virginia, counties in
Counties
Counties in West Virginia, List of